The German Ice Hockey Championship was a former ice hockey competition played in Germany between 1912 and 1948. During its earliest seasons Berliner Schlittschuhclub emerged as one of the strongest teams, winning eighteen titles between 1912 and 1944.  Following the partition of Germany it was replaced by the  Oberliga FDR in West Germany and the DDR-Oberliga in East Germany.

1912–1948 

 
Defunct ice hockey leagues in Germany